Tanjung Tokong is a suburb of George Town in Penang, Malaysia. Over the recent decades, the former fishing village has been transformed into an upper class residential suburb of George Town, with high-rises such as Straits Quay lining the coast.

The area had already been inhabited for decades prior to Captain Francis Light's founding of Penang Island in 1786. Tanjung Tokong was believed to be the site of the first Chinese settlement on Penang Island.  Up until the 1970s, Tanjung Tokong was a fishing village; rapid urbanisation soon followed, with residential high-rises now lining the coast.

At present, the reclamation of land is ongoing off the shores of Tanjung Tokong, creating a new township – Seri Tanjung Pinang.

Due to its location along the northern coast of Penang Island, Tanjung Tokong was hard hit by the 2004 Indian Ocean tsunami.

History 

In the mid-18th century, a Chinese by the name of Zhang Li founded a fishing village at what is now Tanjung Tokong. He had actually intended to sail from China to Sumatra, but the rough seas pushed him to Penang Island instead. His arrival at Tanjung Tokong preceded Captain Francis Light's landing on Penang Island by about 40 years. To this day, Zhang Li, whose grave still lies at Tanjung Tokong, is worshipped by ethnic Chinese in Malaysia and Singapore as Tua Pek Kong, a local deity.

Tanjung Tokong remained a quiet fishing village until the 1970s, when the urbanisation of the area began. Low-rise apartments were followed by higher condominiums that were constructed along the shoreline. In addition, land reclamation is currently being carried out off the coastline as part of the Seri Tanjung Pinang project. The new Straits Quay marina was created at the newly reclaimed land and opened to the public in 2011.

These developments have led to an increase in the standards of living, as Tanjung Tokong grew into an upscale suburb of George Town, similar to neighbouring Pulau Tikus. However, the land reclamation projects were also thought to have caused the siltation of nearby Gurney Drive, one of George Town's famous seaside promenades. As of 2016, another land reclamation project is being conducted off Gurney Drive itself to create Gurney Wharf, thus rectifying the siltation issue.

Tanjung Tokong was one of the hardest hit areas during the 2004 Indian Ocean tsunami that ultimately claimed a total of 52 lives in Penang.

Transportation 
The main thoroughfare within Tanjung Tokong is Tanjung Tokong Road, which stretches from the neighbouring Pulau Tikus suburb and continues as Tanjung Bungah Road to the west. Part of the pan-island Federal Route 6, Tanjung Tokong Road, as with the handful of roads within the suburb, is prone to traffic congestion. An alternative route for the residents within the Tanjung Tokong and Tanjung Bungah suburbs is the Vale of Tempe Road, which connects with Mount Erskine Road.

Rapid Penang buses 101, 102 and 104 serve the residents of the suburb, by connecting Tanjung Tokong with George Town and other destinations on Penang Island, such as Tanjung Bungah, Batu Ferringhi, the Penang International Airport and Queensbay Mall. Aside from these routes, Tanjung Tokong is served by two free-of-charge transit services, namely the Pulau Tikus Loop (PTL) and the Congestion Alleviation Transport (CAT) Tanjung Tokong route, which are also operated by Rapid Penang.

Another bus service, the Hop-On Hop-Off service, caters primarily to tourists. This service, which utilises open-top double decker buses, includes a stop at Straits Quay.

The Tanjung Tokong transit line is a proposed eight station, 7 km public transportation line to link the upcoming Komtar integrated interchange station and terminate at Tanjung Tokong as part of the Penang Transport Masterplan. It would feed through Jalan Burma, Jalan Kelawei, Gurney Drive and the Seri Tanjung Pinang.

Education 
A total of 3 primary schools are located within Tanjung Tokong. The schools at Tanjung Tokong are as listed below.

Primary schools
 SRK Tanjong Tokong
 SRJK (C) Hun Bin
 SRJK (C) Phor Tay

Shopping 

The two existing shopping malls within the Tanjung Tokong suburb are Straits Quay and Island Plaza.

Straits Quay, built at the new Seri Tanjung Pinang neighbourhood, includes a marina and is connected to the Eastern & Oriental Hotel in the heart of George Town via a water taxi service. It also contains a Royal Selangor outlet, a convention centre and the Performing Arts Centre of Penang (PenangPac).

Meanwhile, Island Plaza, situated at Tanjung Tokong Road, houses a number of upmarket outlets, including Cold Storage and Guardian. Adjacent to Island Plaza is Precinct 10, a food and beverages complex.

Aside from the two shopping malls, Tesco also opened a hypermarket at Seri Tanjung Pinang in 2011, its third outlet on Penang Island after the Gelugor and Sungai Dua stores.

, City Mall, an upcoming shopping mall just across Tanjung Tokong Road from Island Plaza, is under construction. The mall is scheduled for completion in 2017.

Sports 
The Penang Chinese Swimming Club at the western end of Tanjung Tokong was founded in 1928 to promote swimming among Penang's Chinese community, at a time when Asians were barred from existing swimming associations. Aside from swimming activities, the club house now hosts other watersports activities as well, such as water polo and scuba diving.

Tourist attractions 
 Straits Quay
 Tanjung Tokong Tua Pek Kong Temple

Neighbourhoods 

 Seri Tanjung Pinang
 Mount Erskine

References

Populated places in Penang
George Town, Penang